Peter Schneider (born 1975) is a German actor and musician.

Biography
Schneider was born in 1975 in Leipzig, in what was then East Germany. From 1985 until the late 1990s, he studied at a music school in Halle. After graduating from high school in 1994 and completing his military service, he studied music at the Leipzig University of Music and Theater from 1995 until 1998. He specialized in the clarinet and saxophone, while at the same time taking German studies and pedagogy at Leipzig University. In 1998, he switched to studying drama at the Leipzig University of Music and Theater, from which he graduated in 2002. From 2000 to 2002, Schneider was an acting student at Theater Chemnitz.

Apart from his acting work, Schneider also works as  theater musical director, musician, and composer. He is a member of the Deutsche Filmakademie and the European Film Academy.

Since 2017, Schneider has portrayed middle-aged Helge Doppler in the Netflix series Dark.

Selected filmography

Film

Television

Awards
 Nominated for the Deutscher Filmpreis (German Film Award) in the category Best Acting Performance - Male Leading Role, for Hut in the Woods (2012)
 Nominated for the Preis der deutschen Filmkritik (German Film Critics Award) in the category Best Actor for his performance in Hut in the Woods (2013)

References

External links
 
 

1975 births
Living people
German male film actors
People from Bezirk Leipzig
University of Music and Theatre Leipzig alumni
Leipzig University alumni
German male television actors
Actors from Leipzig